Apollonia, also called Eleuthera (Ἐλεύθερα) was an ancient city of Crete, on the south coast. William Smith states that the philosopher Diogenes Apolloniates was a native of the environs of Apollonia (the Apolloniates), although other scholars claim that the Apollonia in question was the Thracian one. The editors of the Barrington Atlas of the Greek and Roman World place Apollonia at Sellia.

The site of Apollonia is near the modern Sellia.

See also
 List of ancient Greek cities

References

Cretan city-states
Ancient Greek archaeological sites in Crete
Populated places in ancient Crete
Former populated places in Greece